Ninamaninja Kalpadukal (Bloodstained Footprints) is a 1963 Malayalam language film, directed by N. N. Pisharody and produced by N.K. Karunakara Pillai and Shobhana Parameswaran Nair. The lead role is played by Prem Nazir, with Ambika, Sheela and Madhu, who debuted with this film. The film is based on a novel by Parappurath and portrays the trials the Indo-China war. It won the National Film Award for Best Feature Film in Malayalam. It was a super hit movie.

There are many evergreen songs in the film, including "Mamalakalkkappurathu" (by P. B. Sreenivas) and "Anuraga Natakathil" (by K. P. Udayabhanu). The songs were composed by Baburaj, with lyrics by P. Bhaskaran.

Cast 
 
Prem Nazir as Thankachan 
Madhu as Stephen 
Sheela as Ammini 
Ambika as Thankamma 
Adoor Bhasi as Subramaniam Potti 
Kottayam Santha as Lissy 
P. J. Antony as Thankamma's Husband 
Adoor Bhavani as Rahel 
Bahadoor as Mammoonju 
Kambissery Karunakaran as Thomachan
Kedamangalam Ali 
P. O. Thomas
Radhamani
 P. Susheela as Dancer
S. P. Pillai as Bomb Kunjoonju 
R. Nambiath
 Nanukuttan Nair
 M.G Mathew
 Omanakuttan
 Vaidyanathan
 Baby
 Kuryakose
 Mavelikkara Ponnamma
 Santhakumary
 Baby Shibha
 Lakshmi Devi

Soundtrack 
The music was composed by M. S. Baburaj and the lyrics were written by P. Bhaskaran and Meera Bhajan.

Box office 
The film became commercial success, and highest grossing Malayalam film at that time collecting ₹60 lakhs from box office.

References

http://www.malayalachalachithram.com/movie.php?i=110

1960s Malayalam-language films
Films based on Indian novels
Best Malayalam Feature Film National Film Award winners
Films scored by M. S. Baburaj